The 2021 National Football League, known for sponsorship reasons as the Allianz National Football League, was the 90th staging of the National Football League (NFL), an annual Gaelic football tournament for Gaelic Athletic Association county teams. Thirty-one county teams from the island of Ireland compete; Kilkenny do not participate. London did not participate, due to restrictions around travel in place to deal with the COVID-19 pandemic.

In December 2020, it was announced that each division would be divided into North and South sections in order to reduce fixtures and minimise cross-border matches. This plan had been hinted at as early as September 2020. Teams would play three league games, plus possibly two knockout matches, allowing the tournament to be finished in just five rounds of games. In February 2021, it was announced that the league would be delayed due to the impact of the COVID-19 pandemic on Gaelic games and that cancelling it would be a last resort. It began on 15 May 2021.

Due to COVID-19, finals were not played if a team had a championship game scheduled for the following week. It was a pilot COVID test event with 2,400 spectators permitted, and Derry won.

Format

League structure

The 2021 National Football League consists of three divisions of eight teams and one of seven. Each division is divided into a North and South section; each team plays every other team in its section once. Two points are awarded for a win and one point for a draw.

In the top division, Division 1, teams compete to become the National Football League (NFL) champions. The top two in each section qualify for the NFL semi-finals.

Teams compete for promotion and relegation to a higher or lower league. In Divisions 2, 3 and 4, the top two teams in each group play in the divisional semi-finals, with each team that reaches the divisional final being promoted.

Division finals are not played if a team is scheduled to play a championship match on 26/27 June 2021; the division title will be shared.

The bottom two teams in each section in Divisions 1, 2 and 3 enter relegation playoffs, with the losers relegated.

The third-placed teams in each section in Division 4 enter the Division 4 Shield Final.

Tiebreakers for league ranking
As per the Official GAA Guide - Part 1 - Section 6.21 -

If two teams in the same group are equal on points on completion of the group phase, the following tie-breaking criteria are applied:
Where two teams only are involved - the outcome of the meeting of the two teams in the group game;

If three or more teams in the same group are equal on points on completion of the group phase, the following tie-breaking criteria are applied:
Scoring Difference (subtracting the total scores against from total scores for);
Highest Total Score For;
A Play-Off.

In the event that two teams or more finish with equal points, but have been affected by a disqualification, loss of game on a proven objection, retirement or walkover, the tie shall be decided by the following means:
Score Difference from the games in which only the teams involved, (teams tied on points), have played each other. (subtracting the total Scores Against from total Scores For)
Highest Total Score For, in which only the teams involved, have played each other, and have finished equal under rule 1 above
A Play-Off

Division 1

Division 1 North

Table

Matches

Round 1

Round 2

Round 3

Division 1 South

Table

Matches

Round 1

Round 2

Round 3

Division 1 Relegation Playoffs

Division 1 Finals

Dublin and Kerry shared the 2021 NFL title, as Kerry had a championship game on 26 June 2021.

Division 2

Division 2 North

Table

Matches

Round 1

Round 2

Round 3

Division 2 South

Table

Matches

Round 1

Round 2

Round 3

Division 2 Relegation Playoffs

Division 2 Finals

Kildare and Mayo shared the Division 2 title, as Mayo had a championship game on 26 June 2021.

Division 3

Division 3 North

Table

Matches

Round 1

Round 2

Round 3

Division 3 South

Table

Matches

Round 1

Round 2

Round 3

Division 3 Relegation Playoffs

Division 3 Finals

Division 4

Division 4 North

Table

Matches

Round 1

Round 2

Round 3

Division 4 South

Table

London, affected by the impact of the COVID-19 pandemic on Gaelic games, did not compete due to travel restrictions.

Matches

Round 1

Round 2

Round 3

Division 4 Shield

Division 4 Finals

Antrim and Louth shared the Division 4 title, as Louth had a championship game on 27 June 2021.

League statistics

Scoring events
 David Tubridy (Clare) became top scorer in National Football League history against Cork in May 2021, his total score in the competition after this game (22–412, i.e. 478 points) causing him to overtake Mickey Kearins (Sligo, 1961–1978).

References

 
National League
National Football League (Ireland) seasons